Davilson Morais (born February 3, 1989) is a Cabo Verdean boxer. He competed at the 2016 Summer Olympics in the men's super heavyweight event, in which he was eliminated in the round of 16 by Joe Joyce.

References

1989 births
Living people
Cape Verdean male boxers
Olympic boxers of Cape Verde
Boxers at the 2016 Summer Olympics
Competitors at the 2019 African Games
Super-heavyweight boxers
African Games competitors for Cape Verde